This is a list of fossiliferous stratigraphic units in Mauritania.



See also 
 Lists of fossiliferous stratigraphic units in Africa
 List of fossiliferous stratigraphic units in Mali
 List of fossiliferous stratigraphic units in Senegal
 List of fossiliferous stratigraphic units in Western Sahara
 Geology of Mauritania

References

Further reading 
 P. R. Racheboeuf, R. Gourvennec, M. Deynoux and D. Brice. 2004. The Devonian of the Hodh area (Islamic Republic of Mauritania): paleontology and stratigraphy. Journal of Paleontology 78(1):98-110

Mauritania
Paleontology in Mauritania
Mauritania
Fossiliferous stratigraphic units
Fossil